Anders Petersen (born 1944) is a Swedish photographer, based in Stockholm. He makes intimate and personal documentary-style black and white photographs. Petersen has published more than 20 books.

Biography
Petersen studied photography under Christer Strömholm in Sweden from 1966 to 1967. He is noted for his intimate and personal documentary-style black-and-white photographs.

For three years beginning in 1967 he photographed the late-night regulars (prostitutes, transvestites, drunks, lovers and drug addicts) in Café Lehmitz, a bar in Hamburg, Germany. The resulting photobook was first published in 1978 by Schirmer/Mosel in Germany. Café Lehmitz has since become regarded as a seminal book in the history of European photography. One of the photographs from this series was used as the cover art for Tom Waits' album Rain Dogs.

Petersen's first book Gröna Lund (Green Grove), which was published in 1973, is set in the amusement park of Gröna Lund situated on an island.

In 1970 Petersen co-founded SAFTRA, the Stockholm group of photographers, with Kenneth Gustavsson. At the same time, he taught at Christer Strömholm's school. He has been director of the 
Göteborg School of Photography and Film. He began to photograph for magazines, and continued his personal photo diary work, which continues to this day. He has photographed for extensive periods of time in prisons, mental asylums, and elderly care homes.

Petersen has had solo and group exhibitions throughout Europe and Asia. in 2019, he held a commissioned exhibition at the Liljevalchs konsthall.

Publications

Gröna Lund = Green Grove.
 Stockholm: Fyra Förläggare, 1973. Text by Arnaud Cottebrune.
 Villejuif, France: Aman Iman, 2009. . Edition of 300 copies.
 Villejuif, France: Aman Iman, 2013. .
Pyramyd Editions, 2013. French-language version.
Café Lehmitz.
Munich: Schirmer/Mosel, 1978.
French edition, 1979.
Stockholm: ETC Förlags, 1982. . Text by Roger Andersson.
Germany: Fischer Taschenbuch, 1985. . Paperback.
Fängelse = Prison. ETC; Stockholm: Norstedts Förlag, 1984. . Text by Leif G. W. Persson.
Rågång till Kärleken = On the line of love. Stockholm: Norstedts Förlag, 1991. . Text by Göran Odbratt.
Karnevalen i Venedig ETC Förlag, 1991.
Ingen har sett allt = Nobody has seen it all. 1995.
Du Mich Auch = Same to you. Stockholm: Journal, 2002. 
Close/Distance. 2002.
Roma, a diary. 2005.
Sète # 08. France: Images En Manœuvres Editions - CétàVOIR, 2008. 
French kiss Stockport, Cheshire: Dewi Lewis Publishing, 2008.
Dear Diary. 2009.
From Back Home. Stockholm: Max Ström, 2009. . With JH Engström. Edited by Greger Ulf Nilson.
City Diary. 2009. In three volumes.
Strange Evidence. Self-published / Createspace, 2012. . Contains the images from the exhibition Mark Cohen: Strange Evidence curated by Peter Barbiere at the Philadelphia Museum of Art 2010/2011.
Rome, a diary 2012. Rome: Punctum, 2012. Edition of 40 copies.
Soho. London: Mack and The Photographers' Gallery, 2012. .
Veins. With Jacob Aue Sobol. Stockport, Cheshire: Dewi Lewis, 2013. .
Rome Collected photographs from three trips to Rome in 1984, 2005 and 2012. Curated by Marco Delogu in collaboration with Flavio Scollo. 
 Rome. Paperback. Köln: Walther König; Rome: Punctum, 2014. .
 Rome. Hardback. Köln: Walther König; Rome: Punctum, 2014. Edition of 150 copies with signed print.

Awards
 1978: grant from the Swedish Authors' Foundation.
 2003: Photographer of the Year at Rencontres d'Arles.
 2007: Shortlisted for the Deutsche Börse Photography Prize 2007 along with Philippe Chancel and Fiona Tan.
 2007: Special Prize of the Jury for his exhibition Exaltation of Humanity by the third International Photofestival in Lianzhou, China.
 2008 Dr. Erich Salomon Prize, German Society for Photography, Germany.
 2009: The Arles Contemporary Book Award with JH Engström for From Back Home.
 2009: From Back Home was nominated for The Best Photographic Book in Sweden, year 2009.

References

General references
Anders Petersen, Photo Poche No. 98, published 2004, Actes Sud. 
Les Recontres d'Arles Photographie 2006, published 2006, Actes Sud.

External links

Examples of Petersen's early photographs
18 minute audio interview from 2006, and examples of recent photographs
"Anders Petersen - Photographs 1966-1996", zerozero

Documentary photographers
Swedish photographers
People from Solna Municipality
Living people
1944 births